New York's 31st State Senate district is one of 63 districts in the New York State Senate. It has  been represented by Democrat Robert Jackson since 2019. Jackson defeated IDC-aligned incumbent Marisol Alcántara in the 2018 primary election, following primary losses for the same seat in 2014 and 2016.

Geography
District 31 is based in the northern Manhattan neighborhoods of Washington Heights, Inwood, and Marble Hill, also stretching south along the Hudson River to include parts of Hamilton Heights, Harlem, Morningside Heights, the Upper West Side, Hell's Kitchen, and Chelsea.

The district overlaps with New York's 10th, 12th, and 13th congressional districts, and with the 67th, 69th, 70th, 71st, 72nd, and 75th districts of the New York State Assembly.

Recent election results

2020

2018

2016

2014

2012

Federal results in District 31

References

31